Kim Wi-Man (born June 23, 1979) is a former North Korean football player.

Club statistics

References

External links

1979 births
Living people
Komazawa University alumni
Association football people from Tokyo
North Korean footballers
J1 League players
J2 League players
JEF United Chiba players
Tokushima Vortis players

Association football midfielders